Any Day Now is an American drama series that aired on the Lifetime network from 1998 to 2002. Set in Birmingham, Alabama, Any Day Now explored issues around race and friendship and how they affect the lives of two devoted lifelong friends over the years—from the 1960s to the current day. The show stars Annie Potts and Lorraine Toussaint, portraying best friends since childhood, as they openly and honestly address events in their interracial community.

The show's title is taken from the 1962 song "Any Day Now", written by Burt Bacharach and Bob Hilliard. A version performed by Lori Perry served as the show's theme song.

Setting
Any Day Now focuses on the lives and interactions of two female protagonists: Mary Elizabeth "M.E." O'Brien Sims (Potts) and Rene Jackson (Toussaint). The two had grown up as close friends in Birmingham, Alabama, in the 1960s during the peak of the Civil Rights Movement.  However, their friendship ended when M.E. became pregnant and chose, despite Rene's disapproval, to keep the child, drop out of college, and marry her boyfriend, Colliar Sims.

More than twenty years later, M.E. and her husband still live in Birmingham, where they struggle to make ends meet. Their oldest son, Bobby, died as a child; but they have two more children, daughter Kelly and son Davis. Rene moved to Washington, D.C., where she was a successful attorney for many years; but, after the death of her father, Rene decides to move back to Birmingham and establish a law practice there. She reunites with M.E., and the two quickly resume their close friendship.  In every episode, contemporary storylines are interwoven with a storyline from their shared past.

Format
Each hour-long episode explores a theme contained alternating scenes from two different timelines. The 1960s timeline followed the young version of the girls, who were best friends in Birmingham in the 1960s. Their friendship provides an inside look at the civil rights movement as it affects the residents of Birmingham. Their friendship blossoms despite the discomfort of M.E.'s naively bigoted parents and her openly racist Uncle Jimmy, an avowed member of the Ku Klux Klan.  M.E. and Rene's friendship was fostered by Renee's Civil rights activists parents along with M.E.'s loving grandmother and her older brother, Johnny, who was sent to Vietnam, while M.E.'s older sister, Teresa, often threatened to tell their parents that M.E.'s "little colored friend" had been in their house. Colliar Sims (Chris Mulkey), M.E.'s childhood sweetheart and eventual husband, played a large role in this timeline as well.  Rene's family included her father, James (John Lafayette), who was a lawyer and an active member of the Civil Rights Movement; her mother, Sarah, also active in the movement; and her older brother Elston, who was the same age as M.E.'s brother Johnny but dodged the draft by fleeing to Canada.

The contemporary timeline showed M.E. and Rene as adults. M.E. is a homemaker with aspirations of becoming a writer, and Rene starts her own law firm in Birmingham. Characters from the 1960s timeline appeared in the contemporary timeline as well, such as Rene's widowed mother, her brother Elston (openly gay, who has a son by a surrogate), who his partner adopts, M.E.'s oft-divorced sister Teresa (Delta Burke), and M.E.'s aging parents, whose views on race had mellowed somewhat over the years, quite in contrast to unrepentantly racist Uncle Jimmy, who still antagonized Rene if given the chance.

The show dealt with issues like modern-day racism, homosexuality, religion, women's rights, rape, natural disaster, alcohol, suicide, and death.  During Season 3, M.E.'s daughter Kelly dated an African-American boy, Ajoni (Derrex Brady), and became pregnant by him at age 17, much to Colliar's dismay; Kelly and Ajoni chose to marry and keep the baby, whom they named Emmett.  Eventually, M.E. published a book and was invited to teach at the local college.  Rene's over-all story arc dealt mainly with her law practice; although she enjoyed great success as a lawyer, eventually focusing her practice on civil rights law, she sometimes regretted that she had never married nor had a family.  In the final episode of the show, Rene married Judge Clyde "Turk" Terhune (William Allen Young).

In most episodes there was either a common theme between the scenes presented from each timeline, or a direct connection between the events depicted in the past and how it affected those in the present. This relationship between past and present often explores the effect of past damage on the present day.

The show included real-life topics such as police traffic stops that are unusually fatal for Black people, in the episode "It's a Good Thing I'm Not Black" in which Rene is forced to lie down on the sidewalk after being pulled over.

In the fourth season, the actresses Mae Middleton (M.E.) and Shari Dyon Perry (Rene) were replaced by Olivia Hack and Maya Goodwin, respectively, as the producers wanted the girls to encounter more mature storylines.  However, Dan Byrd kept the role of Colliar Sims.

Any Day Now ended after 88 episodes, with Rene's marriage, as well as M.E. and Rene's mothers finally putting an end to their decades-long animosity.

Cast

Main
 Annie Potts as Mary Elizabeth "M.E." Sims
 Lorraine Toussaint as Rene Jackson
 Shari Dyon Perry as Young Rene Jackson (seasons 1–3)
 Mae Middleton as Young M.E. O'Brien (seasons 1–3)
 Chris Mulkey as Colliar Sims
 Derrex Brady as Ajoni Williams
 Olivia Friedman as Kelly (Sims) Williams
 John Lafayette as James Jackson
 Donzaleigh Abernathy as Sara Jackson
 Maya Goodwin as Young Rene Jackson (season 4)
 Olivia Hack as Young M.E. O'Brien (season 4)

Supporting
 Julie St. Claire as Joy (season 1)
 Christopher Winsor as Davis Sims (season 1)
 Christopher Babers as Young Elston Jackson
 William Converse-Roberts as Matthew O'Brien
 Nancy Mcloughlin as Catherine O'Brien
 James Deeds as Johnny O'Brien
 Elise Shirley as Young Theresa O'Brien
 Delta Burke as Theresa O'Brien
 Michael Pavone as Jimmy O'Brien
 Dan Byrd as Young Colliar Sims
 Millie Perkins as Grandma Irene Otis
 Richard Biggs as Bill Moody
 Bronson Picket as Joe Lozano 
 Tony Barriere as Young Tully
 Mary-Pat Green as Odessa
 Taneka Johnson as Lakeisha Reynolds
 Don McManus as Graham Pearce 
 Alyssa Nichols as April 
 Alexandra Hedison as Rhonda
 Monique Edwards as Cynthia
 Calvin Devault as Davis Sims (seasons 2–4)

Production 
Nancy Miller, co-creator, executive producer and showrunner had spent summers during her childhood in Birmingham at a time when there were still segregated fountains. Miller used those past histories in creating the show. Valerie Woods, who started as first executive story editor and later became co-executive producer, was equally committed to creating a show that would examine difficult topics in a useful way.

Miller started trying to get Any Day Now in to production starting in 1990, envisioning it as a combination of Wonder Years and Mississippi Burning. CBS agreed at one point, but then cancelled before production began. 

The writers' room of Any Day Now was diverse - at least 50 percent of the writers were people of color, almost all of whom were black.  The diverse cast members themselves also participate in the creative process. Donzaleigh Abernathy, who plays Rene's mother, is the daughter of Rev. Ralph Abernathy, who was a civil rights leader himself. Lifetime was receptive to the show taking on difficult subject.

Episodes

Series overview

Season 1 (1998–1999)

Season 2 (1999–2000)

Season 3 (2000–2001)

Season 4 (2001–2002)

Reception

Critical reception 

Anita Gates, writing for The New York Times at the onset of the series panned the initial episode, stating that it "strains credibility, embraces stereotype and generally falls short of expectations." Lynn Elber, writing for the Associated Press, noted at its premiere that it had taken eight years for Any Day Now to be produced, due to its ground-breaking format of being centered on race as well as the lives of women, and being set in the South.

Howard Rosenberg lauded Any Day Now on airing "It's Not Just a Word," which reflects on a certain racial slur and its ongoing effect on Black people, calling the episode "Thoughtful, volcanic, important". He praised the show overall for "raking over the still-raw sores of U.S. racism with candor, but also tenderness and humor. He ends his review by saying, "... if sages of the Academy of Television Arts and Sciences don't grant previously overlooked Any Day Now the Emmy attention it deserves this year, they'll have some explaining to do."

Anjali Enjeti praised Any Day Now for avoiding white savior plots and racial caricatures, while focusing on impacts of racism rather than white intent, and the commitment of the producers to delve honestly into difficult topics. Enjeti praised the themes of the show including the trauma caused by racism—both internal and systemic—and the privilege to remain silent in the face of oppression. Enjeti concludes, "If there was ever a time to watch a television series's forthright and intrepid depiction of prejudice, hatred, and the long, windy, and sometimes backward road to justice, it's now."

Awards and nominations

Young Artist Awards 

All performances were categorized into the "Best Performance in a TV Drama Series" category.

1998–1999 — All nominees won their own awards

 Dan Byrd — Supporting Young Actor
 Shari Dyon Perry — Supporting Young Actress
 Mae Middleton — Young Actress Age Ten and Under
 Tony C. Barriere — Guest Starring Young Actor

1999–2000 — Neither won an award

 Supporting Young Actor
 Dan Byrd
 Tony C. Barriere
 Supporting Young Actress
 Shari Dyon Perry
 Mae Middleton
 Olivia Friedman

2000–2001 — (Nominated) Best Family TV Drama Series

Screen Actors Guild Awards

NAACP Image Awards

Primetime Emmy Awards 

2000 Primetime Emmy Awards — (Nominated) Outstanding Costumes for a Series: Mary Anne Aston (Costume Supervisor); Elizabeth P. Palmer (Costume Designer)

See also
 Birmingham Campaign
 Civil rights movement in popular culture

References 

 "Past Nominees and Winners." Young Artist Awards, 2012. Web. 20 Feb. 2012 <http://www.youngartistawards.org/years.htm>.

Notes

External links
 
 
 2019 BlackFilm interview: Lorraine Toussaint on 'Any Day Now'

1990s American drama television series
1998 American television series debuts
2000s American drama television series
2002 American television series endings
Lifetime (TV network) original programming
Television series by CBS Studios
Television series set in the 1960s
Television shows set in Alabama
Civil rights movement in television